{{DISPLAYTITLE:NZR BA class}}

The BA class was a class of steam locomotive built by the New Zealand Railways Department (NZR) for use on New Zealand's national rail network.  The first BA entered service in November 1911, with the last of the 11 class members introduced on 14 May 1913.

Construction and later enhancements

In design and appearance the BA class was very similar to the B class of 1899-1903, but superheated and with a smaller firebox.

In March 1928, BA 552 was modified to have a wider firebox, and later that year the same work was done on BA 498.  It was almost two decades before the alterations were performed on any other members of the class: BA 553 was done in May 1948, BA 148 the next month, and fifth and last was BA 499 in November 1949.  The other BA locomotives were left with unmodified fireboxes.

On straight, flat track, they could haul , and on the arduous Mihiwaka Bank north of Dunedin they were capable of hauling ,  more than the five locomotives that were not upgraded.

Like many classes of specialised freight engines on NZR, eight of the ten BA locomotives were modified to perform shunting duties.  This included an all-weather cab fixture on the tender to provide shelter for crews, and second sand domes.

Operation

The locomotives occasionally hauled suburban passenger trains in Dunedin, but were primarily freight locomotives.  They operated in Otago and Southland on the Main South Line and the many branch lines that fanned from it in the first half of the 20th century.  The enhanced locomotives with larger fireboxes were often seen on the Otago Central Railway.

With the arrival of more powerful mixed traffic engines in from the 1920s' onward, the BA class were largely confined to heavy shunting duties and short-haul freight services in and around Dunedin. One main line duty retained by the class for some years was the Makareao Limestone trains. Some members of the class were transferred in the 1950s to the West Coast, where they operated for a few years on both shunting and longer distance services, notably on the line to Westport.

Withdrawal and preservation

The BA class lasted into the 1960s, late in the days of steam. The first BA to exit service was BA 554 in May 1963, and through the mid-1960s, the class was progressively withdrawn.  At the start of 1969, only one was left in service, BA 552.

BA 552 hauled railfan excursions in the mid-1960s, and in 1968 and into 1969 it was retained by NZR on standby, should extra motive power be required.  In June 1969 the decision was made to withdraw the locomotive, and pressure came from railfans to retain it for preservation. Les Hostick purchased it and it was used to haul an excursion in November of that year, and in September 1970 it was transferred to the North Island, in the process becoming the only member of the BA class to leave the South Island.  Although steam had technically ceased in the North Island, BA 552 and A 423 were used on a steam delivery trip between Palmerston North and Frankton, with BA 552 leading for much of the journey. It was later put on display at the New Zealand Railway and Locomotive Society's Te Awamutu base, where it was held in on static display. In 1994 it was leased to Ian Welch of the Mainline Steam Heritage Trust. It has been restored and is in full running order, capable of hauling mainline excursion trains. It is currently undergoing a 10-year overhaul.

See also
 NZR B class (1899)
 NZR BB class
 NZR BC class
 Locomotives of New Zealand

References

Bibliography

External links
Mainline Steam's page on BA 552
New Zealand Railways Steam Locomotives - Class BA

Ba class
4-8-0 locomotives
3 ft 6 in gauge locomotives of New Zealand
Railway locomotives introduced in 1911